Leroy "Red" Pryor (June 2, 1926 – December 1, 2005) was an American professional basketball player. He played for the Dayton Rens in the National Basketball League during the latter part of the 1948–49 season and averaged 1.2 points per game.

References

1926 births
2005 deaths
American men's basketball players
United States Navy personnel of World War II
Basketball players from Chicago
Dayton Rens players
DePaul Blue Demons men's basketball players
Forwards (basketball)
Guards (basketball)